This is a list of banks in New Zealand.

Central Bank

List of Banks

See also
List of banks in Oceania

References

External links
 Reserve Bank of New Zealand - Register of registered banks in New Zealand

Banks of New Zealand
New Zealand
New Zealand
Banks